Novomikhaylovka is a rural locality (a village) in Meneuztamaksky Selsoviet, Miyakinsky District, Bashkortostan, Russia. The population was 55 as of 2010. There is 1 street.

Geography 
Novomikhaylovka is located 27 km northwest of Kirgiz-Miyaki (the district's administrative centre) by road. Meneuztamak is the nearest rural locality.

References 

Rural localities in Miyakinsky District